Shami may refer to:

Regions 

Damascus, also known as Shami
 Bilad al-Sham
Syria

People

Religious groups 
Shami Jews, Jews from Damascus
Yemenite Jews, some of them also called Shami Jews

Individuals with the nickname
Shami-Damulla (died 1932), figure in the development of Islamic fundamentalism in Soviet Central Asia

Individuals with the given name
Shami Abdulahi (born 1984), Ethiopian long-distance runner
Shami Chakrabarti (born 1960), British lawyer and politician
Shami Hassan (born 1984), Qatari footballer
Shami Kermashani (1927–1984), Iranian Kurdish poet

Individuals with the surname
Abdullah Al Shami (born 1994), Syrian footballer
Abu Ishaq Shami (died 940), Muslim scholar
Ali Al Shami (born 1945), Lebanese academic and politician
Basim Shami (born 1976), Palestinian-American businessman and philanthropist 
Farouk Shami, Palestinian-American businessman
Mohammed Shami (born 1990), Indian cricketer
Mohammed Ibrahim Shami (born 1993), Qatari footballer
Mubarak Hassan Shami (born 1980), Kenyan-Qatari long-distance runner
Mujeeb-ur-Rehman Shami, Pakistani journalist and columnist
Yitzhaq Shami (1888–1949), Palestinian Jewish writer

Other uses
Shamī: a village in Khuzestan Province of Iran
Shami, another name for Levantine Arabic
 Shami, Shemi or Shimi: a village in Semnan Province of Iran
Shami goat or Damascus goat, a goat breed
Shami Hospital, a hospital in Damascus, Syria
Shami kebab, a type of kebab from the Indian subcontinent
Shami or Prosopis cineraria, the state tree of Rajasthan, India
Shami Statue or Statue, National Museum of Iran 2401, a statue found in Shami, Khuzestan, Iran
Shami-Amourae, a demon lord in the Dungeons & Dragons role-playing game

See also
 Shammi (disambiguation)